This is a list of television programs currently broadcast (in first-run or reruns), scheduled to be broadcast or formerly broadcast on UniMás (formerly known as TeleFutura), a Spanish-language American broadcast television network owned by Univision.

Current programming

Upcoming programming

Former programming

Original programming

Telenovelas

Talk/reality shows

News/public affairs programming

Sports programming

Game shows

Music programming

Acquired programming

Telenovelas

Television series

Talk/reality/variety shows

News/public affairs programming

Comedy programming

Game shows

Sports programming

Misc. programming

Children's programming

Notes

References 

UniMas